There are many hundreds of thousands of possible drugs. Any chemical substance with biological activity may be considered a drug. This list categorises drugs alphabetically and also by other categorisations.

List of lists of drugs

General 
 List of bestselling drugs
 List of drugs by year of discovery
 List of drugs that can be smoked

By chemical structure 
 List of 2C-* drugs
 List of benzodiazepines
 List of cocaine analogues
 List of methylphenidate analogues
 List of antidepressants
 List of DO* drugs
 List of androgen esters
 List of corticosteroid esters
 List of estrogen esters
 List of tetracyclic antidepressants
 List of tricyclic antidepressants
 List of substituted α-alkyltryptamines
 List of substituted amphetamines
 List of substituted benzofurans
 List of substituted cathinones
 List of substituted methylenedioxyphenethylamines
 List of substituted phenethylamines
 List of substituted tryptamines
 List of lysergimides

By biological activity 
 List of androgen esters
 List of androgens/anabolic steroids
 List of anaesthetic drugs
 List of antiandrogens
 List of antibiotics
 List of antipsychotics
 List of antiviral drugs
 List of corticosteroid esters
 List of corticosteroids
 List of designer drugs
 List of drugs affected by grapefruit
 List of estrogen esters
 List of nasal decongestants
 List of nonsteroidal anti-inflammatory drug
 List of opioids
 List of progestogens
 List of psychedelic drugs
 List of psychotropic medications
 List of selective estrogen receptor modulators
 List of tetracyclic antidepressants
 List of tricyclic antidepressants

Investigational 
 List of investigational analgesics
 List of investigational antidepressants
 List of investigational antipsychotics
 List of investigational anxiolytics
 List of investigational hallucinogens and entactogens
 List of investigational obsessive–compulsive disorder drugs
 List of investigational sex-hormonal agents
 List of investigational sexual dysfunction drugs
 List of investigational sleep drugs

By medical application 
 List of drugs known for off-label use
 List of psychiatric medications
 List of psychiatric medications by condition treated
 List of veterinary drugs

By other institutional aspects 
 List of approved antidepressants
 List of controlled drugs in the United Kingdom
 List of drugs banned from the Olympics
 List of Schedule I drugs (US)
 List of Schedule II drugs (US)
 List of Schedule III drugs (US)
 List of Schedule IV drugs (US)
 List of Schedule V drugs (US)
 List of withdrawn drugs
 List of World Health Organization Essential Medicines

See also 
 Channel modulator, for links to articles referring to drugs that modulate ion channels.
 List of monoclonal antibodies
 List of off-label promotion pharmaceutical settlements
 List of schedules for drugs and poisons
 List of steroid abbreviations